Macropodina is a genus of South American flowering plants in the tribe Eupatorieae within the family Asteraceae.

 Species
 Macropodina blumenavii (Hieron.) R.M.King & H.Rob. - Paraná, Paraguay, Santa Catarina
 Macropodina bradei R.M.King & H.Rob. - Rio de Janeiro, Paraná
 Macropodina reitzii R.M.King & H.Rob. - Santa Catarina

References

Flora of South America
Asteraceae genera
Eupatorieae